Cheryl Roberts (10 March 1962 – 7 October 2022) was a South African table tennis player. She competed in the women's singles event at the 1992 Summer Olympics. Roberts died from cancer on 7 October 2022, at the age of 60.

References

External links
 

1962 births
2022 deaths
Place of birth missing
Olympic table tennis players of South Africa
South African female table tennis players
Table tennis players at the 1992 Summer Olympics